Drew Bannister (born April 9, 1974) is a Canadian former professional ice hockey defenceman and current coach of the Springfield Thunderbirds in the American Hockey League. He played in the NHL for the Tampa Bay Lightning, Edmonton Oilers, Mighty Ducks of Anaheim and New York Rangers. He finished his playing career as player and head coach for the Braehead Clan of the British Elite Ice Hockey League. Bannister was born in Belleville, Ontario, but grew up in Sudbury, Ontario.

Playing career 
Bannister was selected in the second round of the 1992 NHL Entry Draft, 26th overall, by the Tampa Bay Lightning. Bannister was drafted from the Sault Ste. Marie Greyhounds of the Ontario Hockey League (OHL) where he won a Memorial Cup in 1993 and was chosen to the Memorial Cup All-Star team 1991–92 and 1992–93. He also won a World Junior Championship with Canada in 1994. Upon completing his junior eligibility, Bannister spent a year and a half with the Atlanta Knights of the International Hockey League, Tampa Bay's farm team.

Bannister played in the minors for most of his career, but saw time in the National Hockey League (NHL) with the Mighty Ducks of Anaheim, Edmonton Oilers, Tampa Bay Lightning, and New York Rangers. His most successful season came in 1996–97, when he played 65 games, scored a career-high 18 points, and played in 12 playoff games for the Oilers.

In 2002, Bannister moved to Europe and played for teams in Finland, Russia and Germany. He played in Kassel, Germany, in the 2005–06 and 2006–07 seasons where he was chosen the best defenseman in the 2. Gbun, Germany's second highest league. He also scored the deciding goal in the playoff finals and Kassel returned to the top-tier DEL after two years.

On August 6, 2009, Bannister made a return to North America after seven seasons, signing a one-year deal with the Ottawa Senators. He spent the majority of the season with their AHL affiliate Binghamton Senators, serving as captain. Binghamton's then-assistant coach, former AHL defenseman Mike Busniuk, happened to be Bannister's father-in-law.

Coaching career 
On November 16, 2010, Bannister signed for the Hull Stingrays in the British Elite Ice Hockey League as a player and assistant coach. On July 29, 2011, Bannister was announced as a player and head coach of the Braehead Clan in the British Elite Ice Hockey League for the 2011–12 season, replacing Bruce Richardson.

On June 2, 2012, Bannister was announced as an assistant coach for the OHL's Owen Sound Attack, which effectively ended his playing career. On July 10, 2015, he left the assistant coaching job in Owen Sound to become a head coach for the Sault Ste. Marie Greyhounds.

On June 5, 2018, he was hired as the head coach of the San Antonio Rampage in the American Hockey League (AHL), the top development team for the St. Louis Blues of the NHL. In 2020, after the Rampage were sold and moved to southern Nevada, Bannister became head coach of the new Blues' affiliate in Springfield, Massachusetts.

Career statistics

Regular season and playoffs

International

Transactions 
March 18, 1997 - Tampa Bay Lightning trades Bannister and a sixth-round draft pick (Peter Sarno) to Edmonton Oilers for Jeff Norton.
January 9, 1998 - Edmonton trades Bannister to Mighty Ducks of Anaheim for Bobby Dollas.
December 10, 1998 - Anaheim trades Bannister to Tampa Bay for a fifth-round draft pick.
September 8, 2000 - Bannister signs with the New York Rangers.
July 27, 2001 - Bannister signs with Anaheim.
August 6, 2009 - Bannister signs with Ottawa Senators.
November 16, 2010 - Bannister signs with Hull Stingrays.

References

External links 

1974 births
Atlanta Knights players
Binghamton Senators players
Braehead Clan players
Canadian expatriate ice hockey players in the United States
Canadian expatriate ice hockey players in Finland
Canadian expatriate ice hockey players in Germany
Canadian expatriate ice hockey players in Russia
Canadian expatriate ice hockey players in Scotland
Canadian ice hockey coaches
Canadian ice hockey defencemen
Cincinnati Mighty Ducks players
Edmonton Oilers players
Espoo Blues players
Hartford Wolf Pack players
Hull Stingrays players
Ice hockey people from Ontario
Ice hockey player-coaches
Kassel Huskies players
Las Vegas Thunder players
Living people
Mighty Ducks of Anaheim players
New York Rangers players
Nürnberg Ice Tigers players
Oulun Kärpät players
Sault Ste. Marie Greyhounds players
Severstal Cherepovets players
Sportspeople from Belleville, Ontario
Sportspeople from Greater Sudbury
Tampa Bay Lightning draft picks
Tampa Bay Lightning players